Juha, Op. 74, is a verismo opera in three acts—comprising six tableaux—written from 1931 to 1934 by the Finnish composer Leevi Madetoja. The libretto, a collaboration between Madetoja and the Finnish soprano Aino Ackté, is based on Juhani Aho's novel by the same name. The story takes place on the border between West Karelia (Finno-Swedish territory) and East Karelia (Russian territory), and features as its central conflict a love triangle between the farmer Juha, his young wife Marja, and a Karelian merchant, Shemeikka. Disillusioned with rural life and seduced by promises of material comfort and romance, Marja runs away with Shemeikka; Juha, who maintains his wife has been abducted, eventually discovers her betrayal and commits suicide by jumping into the rapids.

On 17 February 1935, the Helsinki Philharmonic Orchestra premiered the work at the Finnish National Opera under the baton of Armas Järnefelt. Although a success at its premiere, Juha failed to match the popularity of Madetoja's first opera, The Ostrobothnians; enthusiasm quickly faded and the inaugural production fizzled in February 1938, for a total of just 13 performances. Despite two mini-revivals in Madetoja's lifetime, he considered it the greatest disappointment of his career. Today, the opera is rarely performed and has been supplanted in the operatic repertoire by Aarre Merikanto's modernist 1922 version (first performed in 1963), which is based upon the same libretto.

History

For Madetoja, the 1930s brought hardship and disappointment. During this time, he was at work on two new major projects: a second opera, Juha, and a fourth symphony, each to be his final labor in their respective genres. The former, with a libretto by the famous Finnish soprano, Aino Ackté (adapted from the 1911 novel by writer Juhani Aho), had fallen to Madetoja after a series of events: first, Sibelius—ever the believer in "absolute music"—had refused the project in 1914; and, second, in 1922, the Finnish National Opera had rejected a first attempt by Aarre Merikanto as "too Modernist" and "too demanding on the orchestra", leading the composer to withdraw the score. Two failures in, Ackté thus turned to Madetoja, the successful The Ostrobothnians of whom was firmly ensconced in the repertoire, to produce a safer, more palatable version of the opera.

The death of Madetoja's mother, Anna, on 26 March 1934, interrupted his work on the opera; the loss so devastated Madetoja that he fell ill and could not travel to Oulu for the funeral. Madetoja completed work on the opera by the end of 1934 and it premiered to considerable fanfare at the Finnish National Opera on 17 February 1935, the composer's forty-eighth birthday. The critics hailed it as a "brilliant success", an "undisputed masterpiece of Madetoja and Finnish opera literature". Nevertheless, the "euphoria" of the initial performance eventually wore off and, to the composer's disappointment, Juha did not equal the popularity of The Ostrobothnians. Indeed, today Juha is most associated with Merikanto, whose modernist Juha (which the Finnish National Opera performed on 19 October 1967) is the more enduringly popular of the two; having been displaced by Merikanto's, Madetoja's Juha is rarely performed.

Roles
Juha comprises a cast of eleven roles, of which five are for male and six are for female voice types; tableaux 4–6 also include mixed choir. The principal characters are Juha (baritone), his wife Marja (soprano), and her seducer Shemeikka (tenor).

Synopsis

Act 1
Tableau 1

 Juha and Marja are arguing once again; the Marja is unhappy living with the old Juha
 She threatens to throw herself into the rapids
 Shemeikka, the Karelian peddler, arrives at Juha's cottage asking if Juha has rye to sell
 As Juha goes to the storehouse, Shemeikka flirts with the beautiful Marja
 He assumes she is Juha's daughter or maid, and is shocked to discover she is his wife
 Shemeikka earns Juha's trust by accepting a good price for the rye; he is offered lodging for the night
 Shemeikka sells Juha a silk scarf and golden broach to give to Marja; he accepts far below the market price
 Secretly, Shemeikka finds Marja and steals a kiss; he asks he to come with him to Karelia
 Marja refuses, but when she encounters her Mother-in-law, they argue; Marja threatens to leave with the handsome merchant
 Marja runs down to the rapids, which Shemeikka is departing and climbs "gladly" into his boat
 Kaisa, Juha's maid, runs to her master, screaming that Marja has been abducted

Tableau 2

Act 2
Tableau 3

Tableau 4

Act 3
Tableau 5

 Serves as a short divertissement in which the men and women of Shemeikka's household sing and dance.
 A feast is prepared in honor of Shemeikka's return.

Tableau 6

 Marja feeling sad, rues her fate
 Anja tells her to put on her best clothes for the feast
 Marja refuses and decides she is going to return to Juha
 Juha arrive at Shemeikka's household and finds Marja
 He confronts Shemeikka for abducting Marja and murders him in revenge
 Anja, devastated, screams that Marja "went gladly", which Marja confirms to Juha
 Juha accuses Marja of having made him a murder with her lies
 Without any reason now to live, he throws himself into the rapids

Recordings

Only one commercial recording is available of Madetoja's Juha. It is by the Finnish conductor Jussi Jalas and the Finnish Radio Symphony Orchestra, having been produced in 1977 by the Finnish Broadcasting Company for Yle TV1. In 1998, Ondine released this performance as a CD.
 

In 1934, Madetoja excerpted from Juha two numbers for orchestra: Tragic Episode and Rapids Shooting. The first number is derived from the opera's overture, whereas the second number is drawn from the orchestra music that occurs between Tableaux 1 and 2. In 1998, Arvo Volmer and the Oulu Symphony Orchestra made the world premiere recordings of Tragic Episode and Rapids Shooting.

Writing for MusicWeb International, Rob Barnett argues that the two Juha excerpts—with their "overhung tragedy and whiplash attack"—are "seriously attractive pieces of music". He concludes that two pieces likely will make their listener "want to catch" Juha in its entirety. A similarly positive review ran in the American Record Guide, with Tom Godell describing Tragic Episode and Rapids Shooting as "remarkable interludes ... [that] powerfully convey the complex, seething emotions of the central characters".

Notes, references, and sources

 

Operas by Leevi Madetoja
1935 operas
Finnish-language operas
Operas set in Finland
Operas set in the 19th century
Operas based on novels
Verismo operas
Operas
20th-century classical music